The 1955–56 Allsvenskan was the 22nd season of the top division of Swedish handball. 10 teams competed in the league. Örebro SK won the league and claimed their first Swedish title. IK Baltichov and Västerås IK were relegated.

League table

References 

Swedish handball competitions